Syburg may refer to:

 Syburg, the southernmost borough of Dortmund, North Rhine-Westphalia
 Hohensyburg, a ruined castle in Dortmund-Syburg
 Zeche Syburg, a coal mine in Dortmund-Syburg, now closed
 Syburg (Bergen), an area of Bergen, Middle Franconia, in Bavaria

People
 Friedrich Wilhelm von Syburg (1709–1770), a Prussian major general
 Otto Ludwig von Syburg (1721–1788), another Prussian major general